Thomas Collinge (1898–1960) was an English footballer, the younger brother of Ernest Collinge.

Career
Collinge joined Port Vale in February 1922 and played his only game for the club on 11 March 1922, in a 1–0 home win over Rotherham Town. He was released at the end of the season.

Career statistics
Source:

References

1898 births
1960 deaths
Footballers from Manchester
People from Blackley
English footballers
Association football forwards
Port Vale F.C. players
English Football League players